The 1953 William & Mary Indians football team represented the College of William & Mary as a member of the Southern Conference (SoCon) during the 1953 college football season. The team is considered, within the school's community, to be one of the most remarkable stories in its athletics history. Due to an academic cheating scandal (unrelated to the 1951 scandal), eight of the team's starting members were dismissed from school and another portion of the remaining 33 players transferred out. Among the 24 remaining players, five were returning Korean War veterans and one other had never played a minute of football in his life. Many of them were undersized (the quarterback stood 5′8″ and weighed 160 pounds) and the coaching staff was few in numbers: five total, including Boydson Baird, William & Mary's head basketball coach.

Their schedule was so tough that opposing teams would call ahead to make sure that William & Mary still intended on playing them the following week. The Indians started the season 5–2–1 before losing their final two games after accumulating injuries with few available substitutions. Six of the players went on to play professional football. The 1953 team was profiled in a 2011 book written by Rene A. Henry and titled The Iron Indians.

Schedule

NFL Draft selections

References

William and Mary
William & Mary Tribe football seasons
William